Mellisa Kavitadevi Santokhi-Seenacherry (née Seenacherry; Sarnami: मेलिसा संतोखी-सनिचारी; ; born 27 October 1980) is a Surinamese lawyer, and is currently also the First Lady of Suriname after she became the wife of President Chan Santokhi.

Personal life 
Seenacherry studied at the Vrije Universiteit Amsterdam and the Anton de Kom University of Suriname.
Seenacherry became First Lady of Suriname when her long-term partner, Chan Santokhi became president on 13 July 2020 after winning the 2020 Surinamese general election. The couple married in a private ceremony on 19 July 2020.

References

External links 
 Interview with DesiYUP

Living people
Surinamese women
21st-century Surinamese lawyers
First Ladies of Suriname
Surinamese Hindus
1983 births
Vrije Universiteit Amsterdam alumni
Anton de Kom University of Suriname